Chionanthus evenius grows as a tree up to  tall, with a trunk diameter of up to . The bark is grey. The flowers are pinkish white. Habitat is generally lowland swamp forest but sometimes found on higher ground, up to  altitude. C. evenius is found in Sumatra, Peninsular Malaysia and Borneo.

References

evenius
Trees of Sumatra
Trees of Peninsular Malaysia
Trees of Borneo
Plants described in 1915